"Pressure" is a song by American indie pop band Youngblood Hawke.

Critical reception

"Pressure" has been met with positive critical reviews. Mind Equals Blown gave the song a 7.5/10 rating, calling the song "a funky, energetic, modern indie song," also comparing the song to Neon Trees and Grouplove. Ear Buddy stated that the song was just as good as the band's debut album, Wake Up.  Fender says that the song "stays true to the...band’s happy-go-lucky indie pop, but it also boasts a slinky, club-ready feel to it."  Surviving the Golden Age said the song "continues the band’s mastery of harmonies, vivid imagery and  uplifting hooks."

References

External links

2014 singles
Republic Records singles
Songs written by Matt Squire
2014 songs
Songs written by Simon Katz